The Firefly is a 1937 musical film starring Jeanette MacDonald and Allan Jones.  The film is an adaptation of the operetta of the same name by composer Rudolf Friml and librettist Otto A. Harbach that premiered on Broadway in 1912.  The film used nearly all of the music from the operetta but jettisoned the plot in favor of a new storyline set in Spain during the time of the Emperor Napoleon I. It added a new song, "The Donkey Serenade" (a reworking by Herbert Stothart of Friml's 1918 orchestral piece 'Chanson'), which became extremely popular, as was one of the Friml songs, "Giannina Mia".  The original release prints of the film were elaborately tinted with Sepia-Blue, Sepia-Orange and Sepia-Blue-Pink.

Plot  
Secret agent Nina Maria Azara (Jeanette MacDonald) is working undercover for the King of Spain (Tom Rutherford) as a singer known as the "Mosca del Fuego" or "Firefly." Despite her love for Captain Andre (Allan Jones), she tricks him so that his general will change the French defensive positions, thus allowing the Duke of Wellington to win the Battle of Vitoria. In the end Nina and Andre leave together for a new life in peace.

Cast
 Jeanette MacDonald as Nina Maria Azara  
 Allan Jones as Don Diego / Captain Andre
 Warren William as Colonel de Rouchemont  
 Billy Gilbert as Inn Keeper  
 Douglass Dumbrille as Marquis de Melito   
 Henry Daniell as General Savary  
 Leonard Penn as Etienne DuBois  
 Tom Rutherford as King Ferdinard (as Tom Rutherfurd)  
 Belle Mitchell as Lola  
 George Zucco as St. Clair, Secret Service Chief  
 Corbet Morris as Duvall (as Corbett Morris)  
 Matthew Boulton as Duke of Wellington
 Riley Hill (credited as Roy Harris) - Lieutenant
 Frank Campeau as Beggar (uncredited)
 Alan Curtis as Soldier (uncredited)
 Brandon Hurst as General (uncredited)

Musical Numbers
 LOVE IS LIKE A FIREFLY
 Music by Rudolf Friml
 Lyrics by Otto A. Harbach, Bob Wright and Chet Forrest
 Sung by Jeanette MacDonald
 DANSE JEANETTE
 Written by Herbert Stothart
 Danced by Jeanette MacDonald
 Sung by Jeanette MacDonald
 THE DONKEY SERENADE
 Music by Bob Wright, Chet Forrest, and Herbert Stothart, adapted from "Chanson" by Rudolf Friml
 Lyrics by Bob Wright and Chet Forrest
 Sung by Allan Jones
 SYMPATHY
 Music by Rudolf Friml
 Lyrics by Otto A. Harbach
 Sung by Jeanette MacDonald
 A WOMAN'S KISS
 Music by Rudolf Friml
 Lyrics by Bob Wright and Chet Forrest
 Sung by Allan Jones
 Backgroung vocal by Jeanette MacDonald
 GIANNINA MIA
 Music by Rudolf Friml
 Lyrics by Otto A. Harbach
 Sung by Allan Jones
 HE WHO LOVES AND RUNS AWAY
 Music by Rudolf Friml
 Lyrics by Gus Kahn
 Sung by Jeanette MacDonald
 WHEN A MAID COMES KNOCKING AT YOUR HEART
 Music by Rudolf Friml
 Lyrics by Otto A. Harbach, Bob Wright & Chet Forrest
 Sung by Jeanette MacDonald
 I LOVE YOU DON DIEGO
 Music by Rudolf Friml
 Lyrics by Otto A. Harbach
 Sung by Jeanette MacDonald
 OJOS ROJOS (uncredited)
 Argentine Folk Song
 Arranged by Manuel Alvarez Maciste
 Played by Manuel Alvarez Maciste
 PARA LA SALUD
 Arranged by Herbert Stothart
 Danced by Jeanette MacDonald
 THE DONKEY SERENADE
 Music by Rudolf Friml and Herbert Stothart
 Lyrics by Bob Wright and Chet Forrest
 Sung by Jeanette MacDonald and Allan Jones
 FINALE: "GIANNINA MIA"
 Music by Rudolf Friml
 Lyrics by Otto A. Harbach
 Sung by Jeanette MacDonald and Allan Jones
 ENGLISH MARCH
 Sung by Chorus

References

 Green, Stanley (1999) Hollywood Musicals Year by Year (2nd ed.), pub. Hal Leonard Corporation  page 74

External links

 
 
 
 

1937 films
1930s historical musical films
American black-and-white films
American historical musical films
Films based on operettas
Films directed by Robert Z. Leonard
Films set in Spain
Metro-Goldwyn-Mayer films
Napoleonic Wars spy films
Operetta films
Cultural depictions of Arthur Wellesley, 1st Duke of Wellington
1930s American films